Atheas is a genus of lace bugs in the family Tingidae. There are about 15 described species in Atheas.

Species
These 15 species belong to the genus Atheas:

 Atheas austroriparius Heidemann, 1909 i c g
 Atheas birabeni g
 Atheas cearanus Monte, 1947 i c g
 Atheas exiguus Heidemann, 1909 i c g
 Atheas flavipes Champion, 1898 i c g
 Atheas fuscipes Champion, 1898 i c g
 Atheas insignis Heidemann, 1909 i c g
 Atheas laetantis Drake and Hambleton, 1944 i c g
 Atheas mimeticus Heidemann, 1909 i c g b
 Atheas mirabilis Drake, 1938 i c g
 Atheas nigricornis Champion, 1898 i c g
 Atheas ornatipes Drake and Hambleton, 1935 i c g
 Atheas paganus Drake, 1942 i c g
 Atheas placentis Drake and Poor, 1940 i c g
 Atheas tristis Van Duzee, 1923 i c g

Data sources: i = ITIS, c = Catalogue of Life, g = GBIF, b = Bugguide.net

References

Further reading

 
 
 
 
 

Tingidae
Articles created by Qbugbot
Cimicomorpha genera